Fork River may refer to

 Fork River, Manitoba a settlement in Manitoba, Canada
 Fork River (New Zealand), a short river in New Zealand

See also 
 Big Fork River, a river of Minnesota